Ozona may refer to:

 Ozona, Florida, an unincorporated community
 Ozona, Texas, an unincorporated community, census-designated place and county seat
 Ozona High School
 Ozona Municipal Airport - see List of airports by IATA airport code: O
 Ozona Air Force Station, a former US Air Force radar station east of Ozona, Texas
 Ozona, a 2004 EP and a 2005 album by the English rock band Goldrush